Casole may refer to:

 Casole, a village in San Marino
 Casole Bruzio, town in the province of Cosenza in the Calabria region of southern Italy
 Casole d'Elsa, municipality in the Province of Siena in the Italian region Tuscany

See also 

 Casola (disambiguation)